Serra-Longo Fight Team is a mixed martial arts team based on Long Island, New York that was formed by Matt Serra and Ray Longo. The team has two gyms operating under it, Serra BJJ Academy and Longo-Weidman MMA. It has produced two former UFC champions, Matt Serra (former UFC Welterweight Champion) and Chris Weidman (former UFC Middleweight Champion) as well as current UFC Bantamweight Champion, Aljamain Sterling.

Overview 
When Matt Serra was 17, he met Ray Longo at Oishi Judo gym in New York City and the two became friends.  Longo was an accountant who owned a gym and would train fighters at night. The two formed a team where Serra was an MMA fighter and Longo would act as the coach where he organized and provided all the resources needed to help Serra win his fights. The crowning achievement of the team was in 2007 where Serra defeated Georges St-Pierre at UFC 69 in one of the biggest upsets to become UFC Welterweight Champion.

The team has expanded in size and currently operates two gyms, Serra BJJ Academy and Longo-Weidman MMA. 

Serra BJJ is a Brazilian Jiu Jitsu gym founded by Matt Serra in 2001 and is currently based in Huntington, New York. Serra acts as the head instructor sharing his experience as the first American to be awarded a Black Belt by Renzo Gracie and a 2001 ADCC Silver Medalist.

Longo-Weidman MMA (LAW MMA) is a mixed martial arts gym based in  Garden City, New York and is currently owned by Ray Longo and Chris Weidman. Previously named Ray Longo's International Martial Arts Academy, it was originally founded in 1990 by Longo. Longo is the head instructor. He is a certified instructor of Bruce Lee's Jeet Kun Do Concepts and focuses mainly on the striking aspect. Chris Weidman is a Former UFC Middleweight Champion who was also coached by Longo to defeat Anderson Silva in an upset at UFC 162 in 2013.

Notable fighters 
 Matt Serra
 Chris Weidman
 '''Aljamain Sterling
 Al Iaquinta
 Itsuki Hirata
 Gian Villante
 Merab Dvalishvili
 Matt Frevola
 Ulka Sasaki
 Eddie Gordon
 Pete Sell
 Mizuki Inoue

See also
List of Top Professional MMA Training Camps

References

External links 
 Serra BJJ Academy
 Longo-Weidman MMA

Mixed martial arts training facilities
Sports in New York (state)